There are at least 47 named mountains in Lake County, Montana.
 Anderson Peak, el. 
 Antelope Butte, el. 
 Bandbox Mountain, el. 
 Big Baldy Mountain, el. 
 Big Deer Point, el. 
 Black Buttes, el. 
 Blacktail Hills, el. 
 Burley Peak, el. 
 Butcherknife Mountain, el. 
 Cabin Mountain, el. 
 Clendenin Mountain, el. 
 Coyote Peak, el. 
 Gibson Peak, el. 
 Granite Mountain, el. 
 Grendah Mountain, el. 
 Indian Buttes, el. 
 Indian Hill, el. 
 Irene Peak, el. 
 Kelly Mountain, el. 
 Lava Peak, el. 
 Limestone Butte, el. 
 Marys Knoll, el. 
 Middle Peak, el. 
 Mixes Baldy, el. 
 North Peak, el. 
 Otter Mountain, el. 
 Peterson Mountain, el. 
 Peterson Mountain, el. 
 Pine Knob, el. 
 Red Hill, el. 
 Reed Hill, el. 
 Sand Point, el. 
 Sheep Mountain, el. 
 Skull Butte, el. 
 Slide Rock Point, el. 
 Steamboat Butte, el. 
 Stevens Butte, el. 
 Taylor Mountain, el. 
 Taylor Peak, el. 
 Tepee Butte, el. 
 Tepee Butte, el. 
 Tollgate Mountain, el. 
 Tucken Mountain, el. 
 Twin Sisters, el. 
 Wolf Butte, el. 
 Woodhurst Mountain, el. 
 Yogo Peak, el.

See also
 List of mountains in Montana
 List of mountain ranges in Montana

Notes

Lake